The 4.5 inch Mark 8 is a British naval gun system which currently equips the Royal Navy's destroyers and frigates, and some British destroyers and frigates sold to other countries.

Background 
Guns with a 4.5 inch calibre have been the standard medium-calibre gun of the Royal Navy for use against surface, aircraft and shore targets since 1938. The current 55-calibre Mark 8 gun replaced the World War II era 45-calibre QF 4.5-inch Mk I – V naval guns. Like all British 4.5 inch naval guns, it has a calibre of 4.45 inches (113 mm).

Design 
A completely new type of 4.5 inch gun with a longer 55-calibre barrel, it was designed in the 1960s for the Royal Navy's new classes of frigates and destroyers. The new weapon, built by Vickers Ltd Armament Division, was developed by the Royal Armament Research and Development Establishment using the Ordnance, QF 105 mm L13 of the Abbot self-propelled gun as a starting point (it used electrical primers). The outer shell of the gunhouse is built from glass-reinforced plastic (GRP).

The new weapon emphasised reliability and rapid response to fire first round from shutdown state (particularly for defence against missiles) over a high rate of fire, allowing a switch to a lighter, single barrel mounting and ammunition of a one-piece design.

The gun system has a combination of electrical and hydraulic components and the full system penetrates up to three deck levels below the weather deck; deep magazine, gun control room and power room, gunbay and the gunhouse.

The weapon is semi-automatic and can be operated by a smaller crew than its predecessors. With no personnel in the gunhouse, loading is supported by personnel in the gunbay to load the feed ring and in the deep magazine to pass ammunition to the gunbay.  The captain of the gun in the control room ensures continued weapon readiness and the gun controller in the operations room aims and fires the weapon. The gun has a rate of fire of about 25 rounds per minute and a range of 12 nm (22 km; 27.5 km with the newer High Explosive Extended Range round).

The first recipient of the new gun and mount, the Mark 8, was the Iranian frigate Zaal in 1971. The gun entered Royal Navy service in 1973 on the new destroyer Bristol.

These guns proved to be less reliable than the older 4.5 inch Mark V gun (redesignated Mark 6 gun mounting) during the Falklands War, being forced to cease fire on several occasions due to faults.

The first major modification to the mounting, the Mod 1, was developed in 1998 in two tranches; replacing the gunhouse with a reduced radar cross section assembly and replacing the hydraulic loading mechanism with an all-electric system. This particular gun has been nicknamed the "Kryten gun" by members of Royal Navy, after the odd shaped head of a robot from the British Sci-fi comedy series Red Dwarf. Babcock upgraded 13 guns to Mod 1 standard between 2005 and 2012.

Ammunition 

HE ER :
Weight of complete round - 80.5 lbs. (36.5 kg)
Length of complete round - 48.7 in (123.8 cm)
Projectile weight - 45.4 lbs. (20.6 kg)
Bursting charge - 6.6 lbs. (3 kg) RDX/TNT (60/40)
Propellant charge - 15.8 lbs. (7.15 kg)
Muzzle velocity - 2,850 fps (869 m/s)
Cartridge case - Brass, 114 x 700 mm R

HE N4A1 :
Weight of complete round - 80.5 lbs. (36.5 kg)
Length of complete round - 48.7 in (123.8 cm)
Projectile weight - 46 lbs. (20.9 kg)
Bursting charge - N/A
Propellant charge - 15.8 lbs. (7.15 kg)
Muzzle velocity - 2,850 fps (869 m/s)
Cartridge case - Brass, 114 x 700 mm R

155 mm variant 
The Ministry of Defence investigated a proposal from BAE Systems to adapt the 4.5 inch system to accept the heavier calibre 155 mm (6.1 inch) gun barrel and breech from the AS-90 self-propelled gun. This "155mm Third Generation Maritime Fire Support" (155 TMF) would introduce a common gun calibre for the British Army and Royal Navy, helping with ammunition logistics, and encouraging joint Army-Navy development of extended range and precision guided shells. A £4m contract was awarded to develop a prototype, and firing trials were scheduled for 2009 with delivery in 2014, but the project was cancelled in the cuts implemented following the 2010 Strategic Defence and Security Review.

Operational history 

In 2011, the Royal Navy's HMS Iron Duke used its Mk 8 gun to destroy a gun battery outside of the besieged town of Misrata, Libya, while HMS Liverpool used its Mk 8 gun to destroy a shore battery that had fired missiles at her.

Replacement 
Although the Mk 8 was fitted to the Type 45 destroyer, on the Type 26 frigate it will be supplanted by the BAE 5-inch Mk 45 naval gun.

Deployment 
 
 Type 45 guided missile destroyer
 Type 23 frigate
 Type 22 (Batch 3) frigate
 Type 21 frigate
 Type 42 guided missile destroyer
 Type 82 guided missile destroyer
 
 Type 23 frigate
 
  former Type 42, converted into a multi-purpose transport ship
  Type 42 guided missile destroyer
 
 
 
 
 
 
 
 
  destroyer

Gallery

See also 
 QF 4.5-inch Mk I – V naval gun – British predecessor
 Advanced Gun System – BAE's new 155 mm long-range gun system for the US Navy's Zumwalt class destroyers

Weapons of comparable role, performance and era 
 5"/54 caliber Mark 45 gun: contemporary standard naval gun for US ships
 AK-130: contemporary 130 mm twin standard naval gun mounting for Russian ships
 H/PJ-38 130mm naval gun : contemporary 130 mm standard naval gun mounting for Chinese ships
 French 100 mm naval gun: contemporary standard naval gun for French ships
 Otobreda 127/54 Compact and Otobreda 127/64: contemporary 127 mm naval gun from Italian manufacturer Oto Melara

Notes

References 
 Tony DiGiulian, British 4.5"/55 (11.4 cm) Mark 8 Mod 0 114 mm/55 (4.5") Mark 8 Mod 1

External links 

113 mm artillery
Cold War artillery of the United Kingdom
Naval guns of the United Kingdom
Military equipment introduced in the 1970s